Adrian Pulis (born 30 March 1979 in Malta) is a professional footballer currently playing for Gozo Football League First Division side Nadur Youngsters, where he plays as a defender.

Playing career

St. Patrick
Pulis started his career with Maltese Premier League side St. Patrick, and made his debut during the 1998–99 season. Pulis went on to make 15 appearances and scored one goal, however St. Patrick finished the season in ninth position in the Maltese Premier League, and were relegated to the Maltese First Division.

Pulis remained with St. Patrick for the 1999-2000 season, hoping to help the club gain an immediate return to the Maltese Premier League. Unfortunately, Pulis could not help St. Patrick make an instant return to the Maltese Premier League, with the club securing a mid table finish.

Hibernians
Pulis joined Maltese Premier League side Hibernians for the 2000–01 season. In his first season, Pulis was a bit part player in the Hibernians squad, making the odd appearance, but never having a clear run in the first team. He went on to make nine appearances, failing to score, as Hibernians recorded a fourth-place finish in the Maltese Premier League.

The 2001–02 season was the season Pulis made his mark with Hibernians, he was a member of the Hibernians squad that won the Maltese Premier League title. Pulis went on to make 20 appearances and score one goal during that season.

Despite the success of the previous season, Pulis and Hibernians could not emulate the same achievement during the 2002–03 season. The club went on to finish the season in fourth position in the Maltese Premier League, with Pulis making 24 appearances, but failing to score any goals.

The 2003–04 season was another that Pulis was heavily involved. Hibernians went on to finish one place better than the previous season, in third position. Pulis made 21 appearances and scored one goal during the season.

The 2004–05 season, Pulis helped Hibernians to another third-place finish in the Maltese Premier League. He made 23 appearances and scoring one goal. Pulis received his first cap for the Maltese national team during the season.

His form continued into the 2005–06 season, he helped Hibernians secure a fourth-place finish in the Maltese Premier League, making 24 appearances and scored one goal. Pulis also helped the club win the Maltese Cup.

Pulis went into the 2006–07 season, and added to his medals collection, as Hibernians secured the Maltese Cup for the second consecutive season. On the domestic front, Hibernians finished in fifth position in the Maltese Premier League, with Pulis making 20 appearances and scoring one goal.

The 2007–08 season turned out to be a very disappointing one for Hibernians, as the club finished the first phase of the season in the relegation pool. However, they finished the season in seventh position. Pulis went on to make 16 appearances, but failed to score any goals. The club did however went on to win the Maltese Super Cup.

Hibernians went from one extreme to the other during the 2008–09 season. Under the guidance of new manager Mark Miller, the club surprised the odds and beat Valletta by two points to win the Maltese Premier League title. Pulis played a big role making 24 appearances and scored two goals.

Honours
Hibernians

Winner
 2001–02, 2008–09 Maltese Premier League
 2006, 2007 Maltese Cup
 2007–08 Maltese Super Cup

Career statistics
Statistics accurate as of match played 9 August 2009.

References

External links
 Adrian Pulis at MaltaFootball.com
 

Living people
Maltese footballers
Malta international footballers
St. Patrick F.C. players
Hibernians F.C. players
Nadur Youngsters F.C. players
1979 births
Association football defenders